Stefan Vukovic (born March 18, 1993) is a Canadian former soccer player and assistant coach for Hamilton City SC in the Canadian Soccer League.

Career

Club career
Vukovic began his career in 2009 with the Serbian White Eagles of the Canadian Soccer League. In 2010, he helped Serbia finish as runners-up in the regular season, and featured in the quarterfinals against Brantford Galaxy, but were defeated by a score of 1-0. In 2011, he signed with TFC Academy, and won the CSL Golden Boot in 2011. The following season, he was transferred to the Montreal Impact Academy, and clinched a postseason berth for the club by finishing second in the standings. Vukovic went abroad to Poland to sign with Śląsk Wrocław, and at the conclusion of the season he signed with A.P.S. Zakynthos of the Gamma Ethniki.

In 2014, he returned to Canada to sign with K-W United FC of the USL Premier Development League. Vukovic returned to TFC Academy in 2015, but was soon loaned to TFC's reserve team Toronto FC II in the United Soccer League. In 2016, he returned to the CSL to sign with Brantford Galaxy.

International career
Vukovic appeared for the Canada U20 side at the 2013 CONCACAF U-20 Championship and at the 2013 Jeux de la Francophonie.

Managerial career
Vukovic was the U10 and U13 head coach for the Hamilton Serbians from 2016 till 2018. In 2018, he served as an assistant coach for Hamilton City SC in the Canadian Soccer League. He also became associated with Burlington SC Academy as the U12 and U15 head coach.

References

External links
 

1993 births
Living people
Soccer players from Hamilton, Ontario
Canadian soccer players
Serbian White Eagles FC players
K-W United FC players
Toronto FC players
Toronto FC II players
Association football forwards
USL Championship players
Canadian Soccer League (1998–present) players
Canadian people of Serbian descent
Canadian people of Montenegrin descent
Canada men's youth international soccer players
Montreal Impact U23 players
Brantford Galaxy players
A.P.S. Zakynthos players